Radikovci is a village in Croatia, located in the region of Slavonia, Osijek-Baranja County.

References 

Populated places in Osijek-Baranja County